La Profecía de Urayoán is the fourth album from Puerto Rican folk singer Roy Brown. The album was released by Disco Libre in 1976. It is the second album to feature collaborations between Brown and Cuban singer/songwriter Silvio Rodríguez.

Recording

La Profecía de Urayoán was recorded at the EGREM studios in Havana during the month of September 1975. The album featured two songs written by Cuban singer/songwriter Silvio Rodríguez. Some of the guest musicians were members of the Cuban Institute of Cinematographic Art and Industry (ICAIC).

The album is also notable for featuring "En la vida todo es ir", which is Roy Brown's first song based on a poem of Juan Antonio Corretjer. Brown followed this album with Distancias, which is all based on Corretjer poems. He also recorded other versions of the song "En la vida todo es ir". It has also been recorded by Spanish singer/songwriter Joan Manuel Serrat.

The song "Una mujer y un hombre" is based on a poem by Argentinean Juan Gelman.

Track listing

Personnel

Musicians
Miguel Cubano - guitars and cuatro
José González - drums and guitars
Harry Torres - bass
Toni Fornaris - percussion
Emiliano Salvador - piano on Tracks 2 and 4
Manuel Valera - soprano sax on Track 1

Recording and production
 Pedro Téllez - recording
 German Pinelli - production

Notes 

1976 albums
Roy Brown (Puerto Rican musician) albums